The 2018–19 season was SC Heerenveen's 54th season in existence and the club's 26th consecutive season in the top flight of Dutch football. In addition to the domestic league, SC Heerenveen participated in this season's edition of the KNVB Cup.

Players

First-team squad

Eredivisie

League table

Matches

KNVB Cup

References

External links

SC Heerenveen seasons
SC Heerenveen